Aurica Valeria Motogna-Beşe (born 16 December 1979 in Bistriţa, Romania) is a retired Romanian handball player who played mainly as a defender for the Romania women's national handball team. She carried the flag during the opening ceremony of the 2008 Summer Olympics in Beijing.

References

External links
profile

1979 births
Living people
Sportspeople from Bistrița
Romanian female handball players
Olympic handball players of Romania
Handball players at the 2000 Summer Olympics
Handball players at the 2008 Summer Olympics